The Dynamiter is a 2011 American drama film directed by Matthew Gordon and starring William Patrick Ruffin.  It is Gordon's feature directorial debut.

Cast
William Patrick Ruffin
John Alex Nunnery
Joyce Baldwin
Patrick Rutherford
Ciara McMillan
Byron Hughes
Sarah Fortner
Mike Jones

Production
The film was shot in Mississippi.

Release
The film premiered at the Berlin International Film Festival in February 2011.  It was also released at the Zeitgeist Multi-Disciplinary Arts Center in New Orleans on September 28, 2012.

In February 2012, Film Movement acquired North American distribution rights to the film.

Reception
Mike Scott of the Times-Picayune awarded the film two stars out of five.

Nominations
At the 27th Independent Spirit Awards, the film was nominated for Best Cinematography and the John Cassavetes Award.

References

External links
 
 

American drama films
2011 drama films
2011 films
Films shot in Mississippi
Films with screenplays by Brad Ingelsby
2010s English-language films
2010s American films